The China Cup International Football Championship is an annual association football tournament organized in China by  Wanda Sports Holdings. The Championship  was inaugurated in 2017 as a single-elimination tournament with four national teams, of which one is China, the host. It is planned to build up to eight teams.

Tournaments

Summary

All-time top goalscorers

See also
 Four Nations Tournament (women's football)
 Four Nations Tournament (China)
 Yongchuan International Tournament

References

External links
 
 

 
Football cup competitions in China
International men's association football invitational tournaments
Chinese football friendly trophies
Recurring sporting events established in 2017
2017 establishments in China